Clube Atlético da Barra da Tijuca, commonly known as Barra da Tijuca, is a Brazilian football club based in Rio de Janeiro, Rio de Janeiro state, adopting similar colors and team kits as Fluminense

Stadium
Clube Atlético da Barra da Tijuca play their home games at Estádio Eustáquio Marques. The stadium has a maximum capacity of 1.000 people.

References

External links
Official website 

Association football clubs established in 2010
Football clubs in Rio de Janeiro (state)
2010 establishments in Brazil